

Acts of the National Assembly for Wales

|-
| {{|Public Health (Wales) Act 2017|cyshort=Deddf Iechyd y Cyhoedd (Cymru) 2017|anaw|2|03-07-2017|maintained=y|url=deddf-iechyd-y-cyhoedd-cymru-2017-public-health-wales-act-2017|An Act of the National Assembly for Wales to make provision for a national strategy on tackling obesity; about smoking; for a register of retailers of tobacco and nicotine products; about the handing over of tobacco and nicotine products to persons aged under 18; about the performance of certain procedures for aesthetic or therapeutic purposes; about intimate piercing of children; about health impact assessments; about assessing the local need for pharmaceutical services; about pharmaceutical lists; about assessing the local need for public toilets; about fixed penalty receipts for food hygiene rating offences; and for connected purposes.|cylong=Deddf Cynulliad Cenedlaethol Cymru i wneud darpariaeth ar gyfer strategaeth genedlaethol ar fynd i'r afael â gordewdra; ynghylch ysmygu; ar gyfer cofrestr o fanwerthwyr tybaco a chynhyrchion nicotin; ynghylch rhoi tybaco a chynhyrchion nicotin i bersonau o dan 18 oed; ynghylch rhoi triniaethau penodol at ddibenion esthetig neu therapiwtig; ynghylch rhoi twll mewn rhan bersonol o gorff plentyn; ynghylch asesiadau o'r effaith ar iechyd; ynghylch asesu'r angen lleol am wasanaethau fferyllol; ynghylch rhestrau fferyllol; ynghylch asesu'r angen lleol am doiledau cyhoeddus; ynghylch derbyniadau cosb benodedig ar gyfer troseddau sgorio hylendid bwyd; ac at ddibenion cysylltiedig.}}
|-
| {{|Landfill Disposals Tax (Wales) Act 2017|cyshort=Deddf Treth Gwarediadau Tirlenwi (Cymru) 2017|anaw|3|07-09-2017|maintained=y|url=deddf-treth-gwarediadau-tirlenwi-cymru-2017-landfill-disposals-tax-wales-act-2017|An Act of the National Assembly for Wales to make provision about the taxation of disposals of material as waste by way of landfill; and for connected purposes.|cylong=Deddf Cynulliad Cenedlaethol Cymru i wneud darpariaeth ynghylch trethu gwarediadau deunydd fel gwastraff drwy dirlenwi; ac at ddibenion cysylltiedig.}}
|-
| {{|Trade Union (Wales) Act 2017|cyshort=Deddf yr Undebau Llafur (Cymru) 2017|anaw|4|07-09-2017|maintained=y|url=deddf-yr-undebau-llafur-cymru-2017-trade-union-wales-act-2017|An Act of the National Assembly for Wales to make provision about industrial action and trade union activity in relation to the operations of, and services provided by, devolved public authorities.|cylong=Deddf Cynulliad Cenedlaethol Cymru i wneud darpariaeth ynghylch gweithredu diwydiannol a gweithgarwch undebau llafur mewn perthynas â gweithrediadau awdurdodau cyhoeddus datganoledig a'r gwasanaethau a ddarperir ganddynt.}}
}}

References

2017